Pohjola is a district of the city of Turku, in Finland. It is located to the north of the city centre, between Ratapihankatu and Kähäri. Turku Central railway station is located in Pohjola, and about half of the district's land area is owned by the VR railway company.

The current population of Pohjola is 1,569, and it is decreasing at an annual rate of 1.27%. 12.62% of the district's population are under 15 years old, while 13.77% are over 65. The district's linguistic makeup is 94.26% Finnish, 3.76% Swedish, and 1.98% other.

See also
 Districts of Turku
 Districts of Turku by population

Districts of Turku